A Sun Dance is a Native American ceremony.

Sun dance or Sundance may also refer to:

Places 
Canada
Sundance, Calgary, Alberta, a neighbourhood
Sundance, Manitoba, a ghost town

United States
Sundance, New Mexico, a census-designated place
Sundance, Wyoming, the county seat and largest community in Crook County
Sundance Resort, a ski resort in Utah

People 
Sundance (activist), American Indian civil rights activist and director of the Cleveland branch of the American Indian Movement
Sundance (rapper) (born 1972), American rapper and radio personality
Sundance, a Secret Service code name shared by Ethel Kennedy and Al Gore
Sundance Bilson-Thompson, Australian physicist
Sundance Head (born 1979), American country singer and season 6 American Idol contestant, and winner of season 11 of The Voice
Sundance Kid (1867–1908), nickname of Harry Longabaugh

Art, entertainment, and media

Films
Butch Cassidy and the Sundance Kid (1969), an American Western film
Sundance and the Kid (1969), a spaghetti Western film

Music 
"Sun Dance" (song), by Tomahawk
Sun Dance (album), by Aimer
Sundance (album), by Chick Corea
The Sundance Kids, an Australian pop rock band

Sundance Group
Sundance Group, an umbrella corporation run by Robert Redford with subsidiaries:
Sundance Film Festival, held annually in Utah
Sundance Institute, a center located in Utah's Wasatch Mountains that allows emerging filmmakers to cultivate their craft
Sundance TV (formerly known as Sundance Channel), an American digital cable and satellite television and film network owned by AMC Networks
Sundance Catalog, a retail company selling clothing, jewelry, bags, shoes, accessories, and home furnishings
Sundance Resort, a ski resort located outside of Provo, UT

Other arts, entertainment, and media
Sundance (video game), released in 1979
Sundance, a pony character in My Little Pony
Butch Cassidy (TV series), a.k.a. Butch Cassidy and the Sundance Kids, a Hanna-Barbera animated series

Transport
Sundance (charter vessel), on the River Thames
Sundance, a call sign used by aircraft of the now-defunct WestAir Commuter Airlines
Plymouth Sundance, a car made by Chrysler Corporation from 1987–1994
Sun Dance 36, a French sailboat design

Other uses 
Gaillardia pulchella, North American flowering plant
Sundance Formation: a formation of rocks from North America's Jurassic period
Sundance Resources Limited, an Australian mining company
Windows Live Movie Maker, a Microsoft application code named Sundance during development

See also 
 Sundancer (disambiguation)